Kunik may refer to:
 Kunik (greeting), a form of greeting in Inuit cultures
 Kunik (surname), a Jewish surname
 Kunik, Poland, a village
 Kunik cheese, an American cheese

See also
 Kunić